The 2019 CONCACAF Champions League (officially the 2019 Scotiabank CONCACAF Champions League) was the 11th edition of the CONCACAF Champions League under its current name, and overall the 54th edition of the premier football club competition organized by CONCACAF, the regional governing body of North America, Central America, and the Caribbean.

Monterrey defeated UANL 2–1 on aggregate in the final to win their fourth title. As the winners of the 2019 CONCACAF Champions League, they qualified for the 2019 FIFA Club World Cup in Qatar. Guadalajara were the title holders, but did not qualify for this tournament and were unable to defend their title.

Qualification
A total of 16 teams participated in the CONCACAF Champions League:
North American Zone: 9 teams (from three associations)
Central American Zone: 5 teams (from five associations)
Caribbean Zone: 1 team (from one association)
Winners of the CONCACAF League (from one association, from either Central American Zone or Caribbean Zone)

Therefore, teams from either 9 or 10 out of the 41 CONCACAF member associations could participate in the CONCACAF Champions League.

North America
The nine berths for the North American Football Union (NAFU) were allocated to the three NAFU member associations as follows: four berths each for Mexico and the United States, and one berth for Canada.

For Mexico, the champions and runners-up of the Liga MX Apertura and Clausura Liguilla (playoff) tournaments qualified for the CONCACAF Champions League. If there was any team which were finalists of both tournaments, the vacated berth was reallocated using a formula, based on regular season records, that ensured that two teams qualified via each tournament.

For the United States, because of the restructuring of the CONCACAF Champions League starting from 2018, two teams each from the 2017 and 2018 seasons qualified for the 2019 CONCACAF Champions League:
The champions of the MLS Cup, the championship match of the MLS Cup Playoffs, in 2017 and 2018
The champions of the U.S. Open Cup, its domestic cup competition, in 2017 and 2018
This meant that the Supporters' Shield champions in 2017 and 2018, and the Eastern Conference or Western Conference regular season champions which were not Supporters' Shield champions in 2017 and 2018, which would have qualified for the CONCACAF Champions League in the usual setup, were not guaranteed a berth in the 2019 CONCACAF Champions League. If there was any team which qualified through multiple berths, or if there was any Canada-based MLS team which were champions of the 2017 or 2018 MLS Cup, the vacated berth was reallocated to the U.S.-based team with the best aggregate record over the 2017 and 2018 MLS regular seasons.

For Canada, the champions of the Canadian Championship, its domestic cup competition which awards the Voyageurs Cup, qualified for the CONCACAF Champions League. While some Canada-based teams competed in MLS, they could not qualify through either the MLS regular season or playoffs.

Central America
The five berths for the Central American Football Union (UNCAF) were allocated to five of the seven UNCAF member associations as follows: one berth for each of Costa Rica, El Salvador, Guatemala, Honduras, and Panama. As all of the leagues of Central America employed a split season with two tournaments in one season, the champions with the better aggregate record (or any team which were champions of both tournaments) in the leagues of Costa Rica, El Salvador, Guatemala, Honduras, and Panama qualified for the CONCACAF Champions League. Another 13 teams from Central America, which qualified through their domestic leagues, entered the CONCACAF League.

If teams from any Central American associations were excluded, they were replaced by teams from other Central American associations, with the associations chosen based on results from previous CONCACAF Champions League tournaments.

Caribbean
The sole berth for the Caribbean Football Union (CFU), which consisted of 31 member associations, was allocated via the CONCACAF Caribbean Club Championship, the first-tier subcontinental Caribbean club tournament. Since 2018, the CONCACAF Caribbean Club Championship was open to teams from professional leagues. To qualify for the CONCACAF Caribbean Club Championship, teams had to finish as the champions or runners-up of their respective association's league in the previous season.

The champions of the CONCACAF Caribbean Club Championship qualified for the CONCACAF Champions League. Another three teams from the Caribbean, which qualified through the CONCACAF Caribbean Club Championship or CONCACAF Caribbean Club Shield (via a playoff), entered the CONCACAF League.

CONCACAF League

Besides the 15 direct entrants of the CONCACAF Champions League, another 16 teams (13 from Central America and 3 from the Caribbean) entered the CONCACAF League, a tournament held from August to October prior to the CONCACAF Champions League. The champions of the CONCACAF League qualified for the CONCACAF Champions League.

Teams
The following 16 teams (from nine associations) qualified for the tournament.

In the following table, the number of appearances, last appearance, and previous best result count only those in the CONCACAF Champions League era starting from 2008–09 (not counting those in the era of the Champions' Cup from 1962 to 2008).

Notes

Draw

The draw for the 2019 CONCACAF Champions League was held on 3 December 2018, 19:00 EST (UTC−5), at the Univision Studios in Miami.

The draw determined each tie in the round of 16 (numbered 1 through 8) between a team from Pot 1 and a team from Pot 2, each containing eight teams. The "Bracket Position Pots" (Pot A and Pot B) contained the bracket positions numbered 1 through 8 corresponding to each tie. The teams from Pot 1 were assigned a bracket position from Pot A and the teams from Pot 2 were assigned a bracket position from Pot B. Teams from the same association could not be drawn against each other in the round of 16 except for "wildcard" teams which replaced a team from another association.

The seeding of teams were based on the CONCACAF Club Index. Each team qualified for the CONCACAF League based on criteria set by the respective associations (e.g., tournament champions, runners-up, cup champions), resulting in an assigned slot (e.g., MEX1, MEX2) for each team. The CONCACAF Club Index, instead of ranking each team, was based on the on-field performance of the teams that have occupied the respective qualifying slots in the previous five editions of the CONCACAF Champions League. To determine the total points awarded to a slot in any single edition of the CONCACAF Champions League, CONCACAF used the following formula:

The 16 teams were distributed in the pots as follows:

Notes

Format
In the CONCACAF Champions League, the 16 teams played a single-elimination tournament. Each tie was played on a home-and-away two-legged basis.
In the round of 16, quarter-finals, and semi-finals, the away goals rule was applied if the aggregate score was tied after the second leg. If still tied, a penalty shoot-out was used to determine the winner (Regulations II, Article F).
In the final, the away goals rule was not applied, and extra time would be played if the aggregate score was tied after the second leg. If the aggregate score was still tied after extra time, a penalty shoot-out would be used to determine the winner (Regulations II, Article G).

Schedule
The schedule of the competition was as follows.

Times are Eastern Time, as listed by CONCACAF (local times are in parentheses):
Times up to 9 March 2019 (round of 16 and quarter-finals first legs) are Eastern Standard Time, i.e., UTC−5.
Times thereafter (quarter-finals second legs and beyond) are Eastern Daylight Time, i.e., UTC−4.

Bracket

Round of 16
In the round of 16, the matchups were decided by draw: R16-1 through R16-8. The teams from Pot 1 in the draw hosted the second leg.

Summary
The first legs were played from 19–21 February, and the second legs were played from 26–28 February 2019.

|}

Matches

Santos Laguna won 11–2 on aggregate.

New York Red Bulls won 5–0 on aggregate.

UANL won 5–2 on aggregate.

Houston Dynamo won 3–1 on aggregate.

Sporting Kansas City won 5–0 on aggregate.

Independiente won 5–1 on aggregate.

Atlanta United FC won 5–3 on aggregate.

Monterrey won 1–0 on aggregate.

Quarter-finals
In the quarter-finals, the matchups were determined as follows:
QF1: Winner R16-1 vs. Winner R16-2
QF2: Winner R16-3 vs. Winner R16-4
QF3: Winner R16-5 vs. Winner R16-6
QF4: Winner R16-7 vs. Winner R16-8
The winners of round of 16 matchups 1, 3, 5, 7 hosted the second leg.

Summary
The first legs were played from 5–6 March, and the second legs were played from 12–14 March 2019.

|}

Matches

Santos Laguna won 6–2 on aggregate.

UANL won 3–0 on aggregate.

Sporting Kansas City won 4–2 on aggregate.

Monterrey won 3–1 on aggregate.

Semi-finals
In the semi-finals, the matchups were determined as follows:
SF1: Winner QF1 vs. Winner QF2
SF2: Winner QF3 vs. Winner QF4
The semi-finalists in each tie which had the better performance in previous rounds hosted the second leg.

Summary
The first legs were played from 3–4 April, and the second legs were played from 10–11 April 2019.

|}

Matches

UANL won 5–3 on aggregate.

Monterrey won 10–2 on aggregate.

Final

In the final (Winner SF1 vs. Winner SF2), the finalist which had the better performances in previous rounds hosted the second leg.

Summary
The first leg was played on 23 April, and the second leg was played on 1 May 2019.

|}

Matches

Monterrey won 2–1 on aggregate.

Top goalscorers

Awards

See also
2018 CONCACAF League

References

External links

 
2019
1
February 2019 sports events in North America
March 2019 sports events in North America
April 2019 sports events in North America
May 2019 sports events in North America